Bollapalle is a village in Palnadu district of the Indian state of Andhra Pradesh. It is the headquarters of Bollapalle mandal in Narasaraopet revenue division. It is the headquarters of Bollapalle mandal.

Geography 

Governance 

Bollapalle gram panchayat is the local self-government of the village. It is divided into wards and each ward is represented by a ward member.

Education 

As per the school information report for the academic year 2018–19, the village has a total of 13 schools. These schools include 8 Zilla Parishad / MPP, one model, one KGBV and 3 private schools.

References 

Villages in Palnadu district